George H. Mealy (December 31, 1927 – June 21, 2010 in Scituate, Massachusetts) was an American mathematician and computer scientist who invented the namesake Mealy machine, a type of finite state transducer. He was also a pioneer of modular programming, one of the lead designers of the IPL-V programming language, and an early advocate of macro processors in assembly language programming.

Mealy went to Harvard University, where he was active in radio as business manager for WHRB. He graduated in 1951 with an A.B., and at that time began working for Bell Laboratories. He later taught at Harvard.

Selected publications
.
.

References 

1927 births
2010 deaths
20th-century American mathematicians
American computer scientists
Harvard University alumni
Harvard University faculty
People from Scituate, Massachusetts